Wing Commander Harihar Gundurao Dattatreya AE(L) (Retd.) (born 1942), popularly known as Dattanna, is an Indian actor who has appeared in more than 204 films and several plays. Alongside his career as an actor, he served in the Indian Air Force as a commissioned officer for over 20 years and also occupied academic positions with Hindustan Aeronautics Limited (HAL). He is best known for his work in Kannada cinema, in which he appears in mostly supporting roles. In a film career of almost three decades, he has won two National Film Award – Special Jury Awards, one National Film Award for Best Supporting Actor and two Karnataka State Film Awards. He is known for his performances in Munnudi (2000), Bettada Jeeva (2011) and Bharath Stores (2012).

Early life and education 
Dattatreya was born in 1942 in Chitradurga, in the erstwhile Kingdom of Mysore of British India (now in Karnataka) to Harihar Gundurao and Venkamma. He has six siblings; brothers H. G. Venkatesh, was a physicist at the Indian Institute of Technology Kharagpur; H. G. Suryanarayana Rao, is a professor of English in University of Mysore; and H. G. Somashekar Rao, a writer and an occasional actor. Dattatreya completed his education in Chitradurga. He secured the first rank in his matriculation exams in 1958, and second rank on completion of his pre-university course in 1959. He graduated with a degree in electrical engineering from University Visvesvaraya College of Engineering (UVCE), Bangalore, in 1964. In 1978, he obtained a master's degree in electrical communication engineering from Indian Institute of Science (IISc), Bangalore. He was the first and last person getting first rank in SSLC state board exams (1955) in Chitradurga school.

Career

In Indian Air Force 
After graduating in 1964, Dattatreya joined the Indian Air Force, as a Commissioned Officer in its Technical Branch. He subsequently trained at Air Force Technical College, Bangalore and while studying his post graduation in IISc, Bangalore, he received a certificate on completion of a project on "Management and Advance Technologies", in 1984. He served the IAF for over 20 years, before retiring as a Wing Commander. Upon retirement, he served in the Management Academy of Hindustan Aeronautics Limited (HAL), the Staff Training College, as its Deputy General Manager and Principal.

As actor 
Dattatreya began acting in plays in the late 1950s and early 1960s, and while studying engineering in college at UVCE. His first appearance in a Kannada film came in T. S. Nagabharana's Aasphota (1988), which earned him the Karnataka State Film Award for Best Supporting Actor. Since then, he went on to appear in several films that have won multiple awards such as Kraurya (1996) and Munnudi (2000). His performance in the latter film earned him the National Film Award for Best Supporting Actor and the Karnataka State Film Award for Best Actor.

Dattatreya's performances in Mouni (2003) won him a National Film Award – Special Jury Award at the 51st National Film Awards. In the 2012 released film Bharath Stores, his role as Govinda Shetty, a Grocery shop owner hit hard when the Union Government increases foreign direct investment in the retail sector, won widespread critical acclaim. He won his second National Special Jury Award at the 60th National Film Awards. He was also awarded the Best Actor at the International Film Festival in Fiji in 2013.

Partial filmography 

 Udbhav (1988) - Hindi
 Aasphota (1988)
 Madhuri (1989)
 Santha Shishunala Sharifa (1990)
 Mysore Mallige (1992)
 Harakeya Kuri (1992)
 Chinnari Mutha(1993)
 Kotreshi Kanasu (1994)
 Lady Police (1995)
 Kraurya (1996)
 Ganga Yamuna (1997)
 Ulta Palta(1997)
 America America (1997)
 Andaman (1998)
 Hoomale (1998)
 Maha Edabidangi (1999)
 Chaithrada Chiguru (1999)
 Prema Prema Prema (1999)
Thilaadanam (2000; Telugu)
 Munnudi (2000)... Hasanabba
 Chandana Chiguru (2001)
 Atithi (2002)
 Don (2003) 
 Mouni (2003)
 Yahoo (2004)...Haladi Nagappas ghost
 Dharma (2004)
 Joke falls (2004)
 Dr. B. R. Ambedkar (2005)
 Beru (2005)
 Siddu (2005)
 Rama Shama Bhama (2005)
 Thutturi (2006)
 Miss California (2006)
 Uppi Dada M.B.B.S. (2006)
 Masanada Makkalu (2007)
 Sathyavan Savithri (2007)
 Kaada Beladingalu (2007)
 Atheetham (2007)
 Hani Hani (2008)
 Anu (2009)
 Maleyali Jotheyali (2009)
 Kurunadu (2009)
 Daatu (2009)
 Anishchitha (2010)
 Cheluveye Ninne Nodalu (2010)... Gopala Gowda
 Johny Mera Naam Preethi Mera Kaam (2011)
 Bettada Jeeva (2011)... Gopalaiah
 Allide Nammane Illi Bande Summane (2011)
 Paramathma (2011)... Appanna
 Dashamukha (2012)
 Bharath Stores (2012)... Govinda Shetty
 December-1 (2014)
 Matthe Satyagraha (2014)
 Bahaddur (2014)
 Baanaadi (2014)
 Haggada Kone (2014)
 Male Nilluvavarege (2015)
 Endendigu (2015)
 Vidaaya (2015)
 Parapancha (2016)
 Godhi Banna Sadharana Mykattu (2016)
 Home Stay (2016)
 Jigarthanda (2016)
 Run Anthony (2016)
 Santheyalli Nintha Kabira (2016)
 Happy Birthday (2016)
 Neer Dose (2016)
 Doddmane Hudga (2016)
 Srinivasa Kalyana (2017)
 Jilebi (2017)
 Prathima (2017)
 Raajakumara (2017) 
 Tab (2017)
 Kempirve (2017)
 Hombanna (2017)
Churikatte (2018)
 Kannadakkaagi Ondannu Otti (2018)
 Double Engine (2018)
 Loud Speaker (2018)
 Amrutha Ghalige (2018)
 Joshelay (2018) - Web Series
 Ajja (2018)
 Ananthu Vs Nusrath (2018)
 Mission Mangal (Hindi) (2019)
 Premier Padmini  (2019)
 Sarvajanikarige Suvarnavakasha (2019)
 Brahmachari (2019)
 Act 1978 (2020)...Venkatachalaiah
 SriKrishna@gmail.com (2021)
 Rider (2021) as Principal
 Nan Hesaru Kishora Yel Pass Yentu (2021)
 Four Walls & Two Nighties  (2022) as Mavayya
 Tothapuri (2022)

Awards and nominations
 1987–88 : Karnataka State Film Award for Best Supporting Actor: Aasphota
 2000 : National Film Award for Best Supporting Actor: Munnudi
 2000 : Film Fans Association Award for Best Supporting Actor: Munnudi
 2000–01 : Karnataka State Film Award for Best Actor : Munnudi
 2003 : National Film Award – Special Jury Award: Mouni
 2011 : nominated : Filmfare Award for Best Supporting Actor – Kannada: Bettada Jeeva
 2012 : National Film Award – Special Jury Award : Bharath Stores
 2013 : Best Actor Award at the Fiji International Film Festival for Bharath Stores
 2016 : nominated, Filmfare Award for Best Supporting Actor – Kannada for Neer Dose
 2016 : nominated, SIIMA Award for Best Actor in a Supporting Role – Kannada for Neer Dose
 2016 : nominated, Filmfare Award for Best Supporting Actor – Kannada for Kempirve

References

External links 
 

1942 births
Living people
People from Chitradurga
Male actors in Kannada cinema
Indian male film actors
Indian male stage actors
Indian Institute of Science alumni
Male actors from Karnataka
20th-century Indian male actors
21st-century Indian male actors
Best Supporting Actor National Film Award winners
Special Mention (feature film) National Film Award winners
University Visvesvaraya College of Engineering alumni
Recipients of the Rajyotsava Award 2022